The Jester Barbarroja (El bufón Barbarroja) is an oil on canvas portrait by Diego Velázquez of Cristóbal de Castañeda y Pernia, nicknamed Barbarroja in his role as a jester at the court of Philip IV of Spain from 1633 to 1649. The painting is now in the Museo del Prado. It was in the Palacio del Buen Retiro in Madrid in 1701 and from 1816 to 1827 it was in the Real Academia de Bellas Artes de San Fernando.

The composition's subject also served Cardinal-Infante Ferdinand of Austria, for whom he played Barbarroja (Barbarossa) in comic plays. He was later banished from the court, to Seville, by the Duke of Olivares for a reply he gave the king when asked whether there were olives in the Segovian town of Valsaín - to this, the jester punningly replied "Sir, neither olives nor Olivares".

References

Bibliography 
Museo del Prado. Pintura española de los siglos XVI y XVII. Enrique Lafuente Ferrari. Aguilar S.A. 1964

Portraits by Diego Velázquez in the Museo del Prado
1640 paintings
17th-century portraits
Portraits of men
Portraits by Diego Velázquez